Sudhakar Bokade was an Indian film producer predominantly working in Bollywood film industry. He produced popular films like Prahaar (1991), Saajan (1991), Dhanwaan (1993) and more. He was considered as a "big name" in mid-1990s in the Bollywood film industry.

Personal life

On 6 July 2013, he was admitted to Kokilaben Dhirubhai Ambani Hospital as he was suffering with breathing problems. He died on the next day post heart attack. He has two daughters and one son.

Career
Bokade produced various Hindi films starting his career in 1990. In 1990, two films produced by him, Izzatdaar and Nyay Anyay were released. The films had a budget of  20 million and  10 million respectively, but they both flopped at the box office. Izzatdaar had actors Govinda, Dilip Kumar and Madhuri Dixit playing the lead roles.

In 1991, he produced the romantic drama film Saajan with Sanjay Dutt, Salman Khan and Madhuri Dixit playing the main roles. The film proved to be the highest grosser of the year at the box office and was declared a "Super Hit". It also ranked in top 10 grossers of the years 1990 to 1994. Along with commercial success, the film also won 2 Filmfare Awards at the 37th Filmfare Awards among 11 nominations. As the producer, he was nominated for the Best Film award, but did not win. After the commercial success of the film, he produced the film Prahaar. Directed by Nana Patekar, the film had Patekar, Madhuri Dixit and Dimple Kapadia playing lead roles. In 1992, he produced Sapne Sajan Ke directed by Lawrence D'Souza, who had previously directed Saajan. But the film failed to achieve the success that their previous project did. His many successful films gave him a "big name" as a Bollywood film producer.

Later Bokade went on to produce various films, including some Marathi also. His project titled Kalinga, a multistarrer film directed by Dilip Kumar remained incomplete due to financial problems that he faced then. The film was Kumar's first directorial venture. At the time of his death in July 2013, Bokade was returning to the film industry, after a hiatus of 15 years, with a film titled Supermodel starring Rajeev Khandelwal, Veena Malik and Ashmit Patel.

Filmography

References

External links

 

1956 births
2013 deaths
Hindi film producers
Film producers from Mumbai
Marathi film producers
20th-century Indian businesspeople